Killingsworth is the eighth studio album by The Minus 5, released on Yep Roc Records in 2009. The album was a collaboration with Portland, Oregon-based indie rock band The Decemberists.

Track listing
All songs written by Scott McCaughey, except where indicated
"Dark Hand of Contagion" (Timothy Bracy, McCaughey) – 3:23
"The Long Hall" – 3:04
"The Disembowlers" – 3:10
"The Lurking Barrister" – 3:05
"It Won't Do You Any Good" – 1:50
"Vintage Violet" – 2:40
"Scott Walker's Fault" – 3:08
"Big Beat Up Moon" (McCaughey, Willy Vlautin) – 3:11
"I Would Rather Sacrifice You" – 2:58
"Ambulance Dancehall" – 2:51
"Gash in the Cocoon" – 3:57
"Smoke On, Jerry" – 3:13
"Your Favorite Mess" – 2:18
"Tonight You're Buying Me a Drink, Bub" – 2:51

Personnel
The Minus 5
Peter Buck – 12-string guitar, mandolin, Fender Bass 6
Scott McCaughey – vocals, acoustic guitar, piano, Farfisa, Mellotron
John Moen – drums, percussion, backing vocals

Additional musicians
Jenny Conlee – piano, pump organ, accordion, organ
Chris Funk – banjo, autoharp, marxophone, dobro
Tucker Jackson – pedal steel guitar
Colin Meloy – lead vocals on 7
Nate Query – upright bass, electric bass
The She Bee Gees – backing vocals
Little Sue – backing vocals
Annalisa Tornfelt – fiddle
Ken Stringfellow – backing vocals
Ezra Holbrook – drums
Steve Turner – electric guitar
Rachael Blumberg – drums
Mike Coykendall – bass, backing vocals
Kurt Bloch – electric guitar
Dave Depper
Adam Selzer

References

External links
Yep Roc's release statement

Killingsworth at Rate Your Music

2009 albums
The Minus 5 albums
Albums produced by Peter Buck
Yep Roc Records albums
The Decemberists
Cooking Vinyl albums